Aaron T. Simmons, most commonly known as A.T. Simmons, was an American architect. He designed 71 Carnegie libraries, numerous courthouses, schools, churches and other public buildings, and most of the houses in the Cedar Crest area of Normal, Illinois.

A number of his works are listed on the U.S. National Register of Historic Places.  Simmons designed six Carnegie libraries in Kansas: in Abilene, Chanute, Council Grove, Downs, Hays and Yates Center.

Works include (with attribution):
Emmetsburg Public Library (1912), 10th St. on Courthouse Sq., Emmetsburg, Iowa (Simmons, A.T.), NRHP-listed
Yates Center Carnegie Library (c.1912), 218 N. Main, Yates Center, Kansas (Simmons, A.T.), NRHP-listed
Dundy County Courthouse (1921), W. 7th Ave. and Chief St., Benkelman, Nebraska (Simmons, A.T.), NRHP-listed
Ayer Public Library, 200 Locust St., Delavan, Illinois (Simmons, A.T.), NRHP-listed
Numerous works in Cedar Crest Addition Historic District, roughly bounded by Constitutional Trail, Division St., Highland Ave. and Fell Ave., Normal, Illinois (Simmons, Aaron T.), NRHP-listed
Chardon Courthouse Square District, Public Green, roughly bounded by Main and Center Sts., Chardon, Ohio (Herricks & Simmons), NRHP-listed
Chase County Courthouse, Broadway between 9th and 10th Sts., Imperial, Nebraska (Simmons, A.T.), NRHP-listed
Council Grove Carnegie Library, 303 W. Main, Council Grove, Kansas (Simmons, A.T.), NRHP-listed
Downs Carnegie Library, 504 S. Morgan, Downs, Kansas (Simmons, A.T.), NRHP-listed
Iowa Yearly Meeting House-College Avenue Friends Church, 912 N. C St., Oskaloosa, Iowa (Simmons, A.T.), NRHP-listed
Oskaloosa Monthly Meeting of Friends Parsonage, 910 N. C St., Oskaloosa, Iowa (Simmons, A.T.), NRHP-listed
One or more works in Penn College Historic District, 201 Trueblood Ave., Oskaloosa, Iowa (Simmons, A.T., and Proudfoot), NRHP-listed

References

American architects